Psionic Artifacts of Athas is an accessory for the 2nd edition of the Advanced Dungeons & Dragons fantasy role-playing game, published in 1996.

Contents
Psionic Artifacts of Athas details the new artifacts used within the Prism Pentad series of novels, and includes tips on how to fit them into an adventure. The book also describes the life-shaped items: Created during the Blue age of Athas, when much of the world was covered by oceans, these items are living entities – boots, gloves and weapons that meld with the skin, and creatures that can, for example, shed perfectly-shaped arrow-head scales while others bond with players to form hidden weapons or imbue special abilities. There are also 49 charts so that relics can be modified or redesigned to fit into an existing adventure.

Publication history
Psionic Artifacts of Athas was published by TSR, Inc. in 1996.

Reception
David Comford reviewed Psionic Artifacts of Athas for Arcane magazine, rating it an 8 out of 10 overall. He notes that "Among other releases, the Prism Pentad series of novels irrecoverably changed the Dark Sun setting and resulted in a revised, second edition of the system, and a series of expansion supplements which seek to bring the referee back up to speed with exactly what is happening on Athas." Comford continued: "Psionic Artifacts of Athas details the artefacts used within the novels and consequently introduces a plethora of new items and rediscovered ancient relics. A minor drawback of the supplement is that the majority of the artefacts detailed here are simply far too powerful to be given to players - The Dark Lense used by Rajaat to imbue the sorcerer-kings with their horrific powers being a prime example - but they do offer excellent focuses for campaigns." He mentioned that "The most exciting objects found within the volume, however, are the life-shaped items [...] and each of these intriguing and unusual artefacts has full statistics and ability details." Comford concludes his review by saying, "Four major items from The Book of Artifacts are not detailed however, and this unfortunately lends an air of incompleteness to the supplement which otherwise would have been a comprehensive guide to the psionic and magical items to be found on the world. Nevertheless this sourcebook is a must for referees."

References

Dark Sun supplements
Role-playing game supplements introduced in 1996